The Osmangazi Bridge is a suspension bridge spanning the Gulf of İzmit at its narrowest point, . The bridge links the Turkish city of Gebze to the Yalova Province and carries the O-5 motorway across the gulf.

The bridge was opened on 1 July 2016 to become the then-longest suspension bridge in Turkey and the fourth-longest (seventh-longest as of 2022) suspension bridge in the world by the length of its central span.

The length of the bridge was surpassed by the Çanakkale 1915 Bridge across the Dardanelles strait, which became the longest suspension bridge in the world when it was opened on 18 March 2022.

Project
Construction and operation of the bridge was awarded to a joint venture (NOMAYG JV) formed by five Turkish companies (Nurol, Özaltın, Makyol, Yüksel and Gocay) and one Italian construction company Astaldi following the international Build–operate–transfer tender that took place in April 2009. In 2010, a contract was signed for the project that was estimated to cost ₺11 billion for the entire highway from Gebze to Bursa.

On 30 March 2013 Prime minister Recep Tayyip Erdoğan laid the ground stone for the bridge. The  highway and bridge reduced the travel time between the two major cities from around six hours to five. The bridge and connecting highway provides three lanes of traffic in each direction. Construction was completed on 30 June 2016.

Two lanes of high-speed railway were also planned to run through the middle of the bridge, but were scrapped in favor for a fourth lane for both ways. The decision lead to criticism and sparked people being suspicious of politicians being involved with automobile lobbyists.

EPC Bridge Contractor
The US$1 billion privately financed bridge was awarded to the Japanese firm IHI Infrastructure System Co. on 16 July 2011 as EPC basis with FIDIC Silverbook contract. IHI, which was one of the contractors of second Bosphorus bridge, also completed the seismic reinforcement projects for Halic and Mecidiyekoy viaducts. IHI subcontracted the design works to Danish engineering design firm COWI A/S, which collaborated for the aesthetic design with Dissing+Weitling. Notice to proceed was given by NOMAYG JV to IHI on 1 January 2013 and the expected total project duration was 37 months.

The dimensions are:
 main span length: 
 side spans length: 
 clearance: 
 tower height: 
 tower size (at the base): 
 deck size: 

The 34,000 tons of steel used to build the bridge was obtained from ArcelorMittal Galaţi, Romania.

The bridge is fourth longest suspension bridge in the world.

Accident at construction site

On 21 March 2015 a catwalk broke away from its bolted joint cable on the south tower during the construction at the bridge and fell into the water. Added in February 2015, the catwalk was needed to allow workers access to the other side of the bay. No one was harmed by the accident as work was interrupted at this section due to windy weather. Marine traffic to and from İzmit Bay was suspended following the accident for security reasons and resumed after recovering the cable in the morning of 23 March.

Kishi Ryoichi, the 51-year-old Japanese engineer of the IHI-Itochu Consortium, who was in charge of the construction at site, committed suicide after the accident. He was found dead at the entrance of a cemetery near his lodging in Altınova. He left a note saying that "...this failure ends my private and professional life. This project was mine and my country's pride. No one else is responsible for this failure."

Tolls
As of 8 October 2021 the bridge tolls are:

In popular culture
The five-time Supersport World champion Kenan Sofuoğlu from Turkey made a show of a motorcycle speed trial in the early morning of 30 June 2016, right before the official opening of the bridge.

See also
 Bosphorus Bridge
 Fatih Sultan Mehmet Bridge
 Yavuz Sultan Selim Bridge
 Çanakkale 1915 Bridge
 Eurasia Tunnel, undersea tunnel, crossing the Bosphorus for vehicular traffic, opened in December 2016.
 Marmaray, undersea rail tunnel connecting the Asian and European sides of Istanbul.
 Great Istanbul Tunnel, a proposed three-level road-rail undersea tunnel.
 Public transport in Istanbul
 Rail transport in Turkey
 Turkish Straits

References

External links

Bridges completed in 2016
Sea of Marmara
Road bridges in Turkey
Toll bridges in Turkey
Suspension bridges in Turkey
Buildings and structures in Kocaeli Province
Gebze
Buildings and structures in Yalova Province
Transport in Kocaeli Province
Transport in Yalova Province
2016 establishments in Turkey
Altınova